Nahuel Valentini (born 16 November 1988) is an Argentine footballer who plays as a central defender for Italian  Padova.

Club career
On 16 August 2018, he joined Serie B club Ascoli on a one-year contract with one-year extension option.

On 9 September 2020 he signed a 2-year contract with Padova. On 21 January 2021 he was loaned to Serie B club Vicenza.

References

External links
 
 

1988 births
Living people
Footballers from Rosario, Santa Fe
Argentine footballers
Association football defenders
Argentine Primera División players
Rosario Central footballers
Serie A players
Serie B players
Serie C players
U.S. Livorno 1915 players
Spezia Calcio players
Ascoli Calcio 1898 F.C. players
Calcio Padova players
L.R. Vicenza players
Segunda División players
Real Oviedo players
Argentine expatriate footballers
Argentine expatriate sportspeople in Italy
Argentine expatriate sportspeople in Spain
Expatriate footballers in Italy
Expatriate footballers in Spain